"Tired of Being Sorry" is a song written by American singer-songwriter Scott Thomas for his band, Ringside. Singer Enrique Iglesias' cover of the song was released as the second international single from his album Insomniac (2008) and achieved success in several European countries where it was a top ten hit. In 2008, the song was re-recorded as a bilingual duet with the French singer Nâdiya under the title "Tired of Being Sorry (Laisse le destin l'emporter)" and became a hit, particularly in France and Wallonia.

Enrique Iglesias version

Background
The Iglesias song is a cover of indie pop band Ringside's song of the same name. Scott Thomas, Ringside's songwriter and lead vocalist, produced Iglesias's version. Iglesias's version is essentially the same, although he uses stronger synth pop elements than in the original, and the line "Chandler and Van Nuys" has been changed to "Eighth and Ocean Drive", exchanging an intersection in Los Angeles to an intersection in Miami, where Iglesias is based. Some fans have noted that Iglesias's recorded version sounds more similar to how Ringside plays the song in concert.

Iglesias first performed the song on his For the Fans tour and was invited by Scott Thomas to give an impromptu performance of the song during Ringside's concert at The Roxy Theatre.

Chart performance
Iglesias's version topped the Finnish and Romanian singles charts. It was also a top-10 hit in Flanders and the Netherlands. The single went triple platinum in Russia with 600,000 copies sold.

Music video
The music video was directed by Jessy Terrero who had directed Iglesias's previous video "Do You Know? (The Ping Pong Song)". The video depicts Iglesias as a vampire perched at top of the Peninsula Hotel Bangkok at night, remembering how he was turned.

Starting with an argument with his girlfriend, Iglesias storms out of an apartment and while on the streets he spots a seductive female vampire, played by model Donna Feldman, and follows her into a busy underground club where she lures him into a back room and bites him. Examining himself in the mirror, Iglesias inspects the bite marks on his neck and watches how his reflection disappears. The final part of the video has Iglesias meeting up with his girlfriend again and they embrace but then Iglesias disappears into thin air.

The song and video were featured on America's Next Top Model, Cycle 9, in an episode focused on video modeling. The remaining girls played various roles in the underground club scenes, and an alternate cut was created, which can be seen on the official CW website as well as on the front page of Iglesias's official website. This version of the video was played regularly on MTV Tr3s.

Track listing
CD single
 "Tired of Being Sorry" (Main Version) — 4:01
 "Tired of Being Sorry" (Ean Sugarman & Funky Junction guitar mix) — 7:17

Credits and personnel

 All tracks published by Highland Songs / Universal Music Publishing (ASCAP) / Enrique Iglesias Music / EMI April Music (ASCAP)
 Photo : Salm / Slamphotography
 Made in the U.S.
 "Tired of Being Sorry" (original English version)
 Written by Scott Thomas
 Adaptation by Enrique Iglesias
 Produced by Scott Thomas

 Ean Sugarman & Funky Junction remixes
 Remixed and produced by Ean Sugarman and Funky Junction
 Dummies remix
 Remixed by The Dummies
 Produced by Dave Audé and Juan Martinez

Charts and sales

Weekly charts

Year-end charts

Certifications and sales

Release history

Enrique Iglesias and Nâdiya version

Background
Iglesias also recorded the song as a duet with French singer Nâdiya under the title "Tired of Being Sorry (Laisse le destin l'emporter)" with French and English lyrics (respectively performed by Nâdiya and Iglesias), and was released in France in April 2008. Both artists decided to re-record the song together because they had the same record label at the time. Iglesias also recorded a Spanish version of the song called "Amigo Vulnerable".

Another video has been shot for the French version "Tired of Being Sorry (Laisse le destin l'emporter)". In it, Nâdiya and Iglesias are singing each from their part (she is outside, while he is near a car) before meeting around the end of the video.

Critical reception
This version received generally positive reviews. For example, Musiqueradio.com website elected the duet version as the "song of the year" and deemed it a "historical duet". Iglesias and Nâdiya were nominated for the 2009 NRJ Music Awards in the categories 'French group / duet / troupe of the year' and 'French song of the year', but they did not win.

Chart performances
In France, the version with Nâdiya entered the French Singles Chart number one on the chart edition of April 19, 2008, with 10,625 copies sold. It stayed at number one for 11 week, and its weekly sales hit a peak of more than 17,000 sales, which was rare at the time in France. The track totaled 24 weeks in the top five, 28 weeks in the top 10, and 41 weeks in the top 50. According to the Charts in France website, over 300,000 copies of the single were sold in France. In September 2008, SNEP revealed that the song was the best-selling single and the 12th-most-downloaded song of the first six months of 2008, and it eventually became the best-selling single of the year. As of August 2014, it is the 62nd-best-selling single of the 21st century in France, with 360,000 units sold.

In the Wallonia region of Belgium, the single entered the Ultratop singles chart at number 24 on May 24, 2008, and topped the chart from its fifth to eighth week. It remained on the chart for 25 weeks. The single re-entered the chart for three weeks after Iglesias's performance of the song on the television reality show Star Academy France, on December 19, 2008, and both singers' performance on Les Disques d'Or, which aired on TF1 during the first days of 2009. The song also charted in Switzerland, reaching number six on the Swiss Hitparade.

Track listings
CD single
 "Tired of Being Sorry (Laisse le destin l'emporter)" — 4:01
 "Tired of Being Sorry (Laisse le destin l'emporter)" (album version) — 4:34
 "Tired of Being Sorry" (original English version) by Enrique Iglesias — 4:05
 "Amigo vulnerable" (Spanish version) by Enrique Iglesias — 4:00

Digital download
 "Tired of Being Sorry (Laisse le destin l'emporter)" — 4:01
 "Tired of Being Sorry (Laisse le destin l'emporter)" (album version) — 4:34

Credits and personnel

 "Tired of Being Sorry (Laisse le destin l'emporter)"
 Written by Nâdiya Zighem, Géraldine Delacoux and Scott Thomas
 Adaptation by Enrique Iglesias
 Produced by Scott Thomas

 "Amigo vulnerable"
 Spanish lyrics by Luis Gomez-Escolar
 Spanish version produced by Carlos Paucar and Enrique Iglesias
 Enrique's vocals production by Carlos Paucar and Enrique Iglesias
 Vocals recorded at South Point Studios (The Crackhouse)

Charts

Weekly charts

Year-end charts

Certifications and sales

Release history

See also
 List of Romanian Top 100 number ones of the 2000s

References

2007 singles
2007 songs
2008 singles
Enrique Iglesias songs
Interscope Records singles
Macaronic songs
Male–female vocal duets
Nâdiya songs
Number-one singles in Finland
Number-one singles in Romania
SNEP Top Singles number-one singles
Songs written by Géraldine Delacoux
Spanish-language songs
Ultratop 50 Singles (Wallonia) number-one singles